Lena Nymark (born 6 November 1980 in Ålesund, Norway) is a Norwegian jazz singer and music teacher raised on the island Sula, south of Ålesund. She was educated at the Norwegian Academy of Music. In addition to vocals, she plays saxophone, clarinet, flute and electronics.

Career 
Nymark's debut solo album Beautiful Silence was released in 2014. In it she played alongside Norwegian jazz musicians Andreas Ulvo on piano, Ellen Andrea Wang on upright bass and Martin Langlie on drums. Previously Nymark participated in the electro-acoustic trio DinoSau. She also has collaborated with musicians like Terje Isungset, Hanne Hukkelberg, Robert Post, Silucian Town, Florebius, Sula Art Ensemble, Trondheim Jazz Orchestra and had several projects with Rikskonsertene.

Discography

Solo albums 
2014: Beautiful Silence (Grappa Music)

Collaborations 
With Florebius
2005: House of Flour (Jazzaway Records)

With DinoSau
2007: A Little Crime (Propeller Recordings)

With Silucian Town
2007: Saga of I-land (AIM Music)

With Terje Isungset
2008: Ice Concerts (All Ice Records)
2010: Winter Songs (All Ice Records)

With other projects
2004: Little Things (Propeller Recordings)
2005: Cast Anchor (Leaf Records)
2006: To Sing You Apple Trees  (Trust Me)
2006: Rykestrasse 68 (Propeller Recordings)
2006: Do Not As I Do (Leaf Records)
2007: Ocean Sessions (Bobfloat Sessions)
2007: A Cheater's Armoury (Nettwerk UK)
2008: O' Horten: Music From The Motionpicture (KAAARec)
2008: Shockadelica: 50th Anniversary Tribute To The Artist Known As Prince (C+C Records, 2008), on selected tunes
2009: Disarm And Let Go Out Now (Bobfloat)
2009: Blood From A Stone (Propeller Recordings)

EP's
2003: Cast Anchor EP (Propeller Recordings)

References

External links 

21st-century Norwegian singers
Norwegian women jazz singers
Norwegian jazz singers
Musicians from Langevåg
Norwegian jazz composers
1980 births
Living people
Grappa Music artists
Norwegian Academy of Music alumni
21st-century Norwegian women singers